Vail, Colorado is a city in the United States.

Vail may also refer to:

Places
In the United States
 Vail, Arizona
 Vail Ski Resort, in Vail, Colorado
 Vail, Iowa
 Salt Lick, Kentucky, formerly known as Vail
 Vail, Michigan
 Vail Township, Redwood County, Minnesota
 Vail, Pennsylvania
 Vail, Washington

Other uses
 Vail (surname)
 Windows Home Server V2 code-named 'Vail'

See also
 Vail Film Festival in Vail Colorado
 Vail Lake in California